German submarine U-327 was a Type VIIC/41 U-boat of Nazi Germany's Kriegsmarine during World War II.

She carried out three patrols, but did not sink any ships.

The boat was sunk on 3 February 1945 by British warships in the Norwegian Sea north-west of Bergen.

Design
German Type VIIC/41 submarines were preceded by the heavier Type VIIC submarines. U-327 had a displacement of  when at the surface and  while submerged. She had two shafts and two  propellers.

U-327 was fitted with five  torpedo tubes (four fitted at the bow and one at the stern), fourteen torpedoes, one  SK C/35 naval gun, (220 rounds), one  Flak M42 and two  C/30 anti-aircraft guns. The boat had a complement of between forty-four and sixty.

Service history

The submarine was laid down on 15 April 1943 by the Flender Werke yard at Lübeck as yard number 327, launched on 27 May 1944 and commissioned on 18 July under the command of Kapitänleutnant Hans Lemcke.

She served with the 4th U-boat Flotilla for training, from 18 July 1944 to 31 January 1945 and the 11th flotilla for operations until her sinking on 3 February.

First patrol
U-327 departed Kiel on 20 January 1945 and arrived in Horten Naval Base in Norway (south of Oslo), on the 24th.

Second patrol
The boat left Horten on 28 January 1945. She arrived at Kristiansand the next day.

Third patrol and loss
U-327 commenced her third patrol on 30 January 1945.

Forty-six men died; there were no survivors.

Previously recorded fate
The boat was reported missing after 31 January 1945 southwest of the British coast.

See also
 Battle of the Atlantic (1939-1945)

References

Bibliography

External links

German Type VIIC/41 submarines
U-boats commissioned in 1944
1944 ships
World War II submarines of Germany
Ships built in Lübeck
U-boats sunk by depth charges
Ships lost with all hands
U-boats sunk in 1945
U-boats sunk by British warships
Maritime incidents in February 1945